"Angels" is a song by Dutch symphonic metal band Within Temptation from their third studio album, The Silent Force. It was released as the third single from the album on 13 June 2005, also accompanying a music video. The video earned the band a Golden God Award in the following year.

Track listing
CD single (two-track)
"Angels" 
"Say My Name" 

CD single (three-track)
"Angels" 
"Say My Name" 
"Forsaken"

Music video

The video is shot in a desert in Spain. 
It tells the story of a group of vigilante angels who make it their mission to wipe out evil.

Sharon den Adel is a woman who has been seemingly abandoned on the side of the road in the middle of nowhere. She accepts a ride from a priest, who takes her back to his home. The priest is in fact a demonic serial killer, who adopts different disguises to get to his victims. All of these disguises are trustworthy people, like a doctor, a construction worker, a police officer, a clown, or a priest.

As Sharon stumbles upon a board full of newspaper clippings in the killer's home, which are about his previous victims, he seemingly overpowers her with chloroform. He takes a tied up Sharon to the middle of the desert to bury her alive. However, Sharon immediately awakens as the other angels approach (the other band members) and is revealed to also be one of the angels, who was left at the side of the road as bait for the serial killer, during which time the rest of the vigilantes appear and the killer is confronted with the spirits of his victims, who destroy him. The vigilantes then move onto their next target.

The theme to the 1979 film Phantasm was sampled.

Charts

Weekly charts

Year-end charts

References

Within Temptation songs
2005 singles
Songs written by Sharon den Adel
Songs written by Robert Westerholt
Songs written by Martijn Spierenburg
2004 songs
Roadrunner Records singles
Phantasm (franchise)